Theater District is a light rail station in Houston, Texas on the METRORail system. It is the western terminus of the Green and Purple lines, and is located on Capitol and Rusk streets near Smith Street. The station is named for the Houston Theater District.

Theater District station opened on May 23, 2015.

References

METRORail stations
Railway stations in the United States opened in 2015
2015 establishments in Texas
Railway stations in Harris County, Texas